Sobinov may refer to one of the following:
Boris Sobinov (1895–1956), Russian composer
Leonid Sobinov (1872–1934), Russian opera singer, father of Boris Sobinov
4449 Sobinov, an asteroid named after Leonid Sobinov
Sobíňov, a village in Czech Republic